Two ships of the Royal Navy have been named HMS Cowslip :

  an  sloop launched in 1917 and sunk in 1918
 , a  launched in 1941 and sold in 1948

Royal Navy ship names